Samejima (written: 鮫島 lit. "Shark Island") is a Japanese surname. Notable people with the surname include:

 (1845-1910), Imperial Japanese Navy admiral
 (1889-1966), Imperial Japanese Navy admiral
Notable fictional characters with the surname include:
, character from the anime series FLCL

Japanese-language surnames